The Institute of Oriental Languages was founded in 1956  on the basis of a number of departments belonging to History and Philology faculties of Moscow State University. N.A. Smirnov became the first rector (1956–1958). In 1972 the institute was renamed the Institute of Asian and African Studies.

Famous alumni

 Tatiana Dorofeeva
 Vladimir Zhirinovsky
 Yuri Bezmenov

References

Education in the Soviet Union
Moscow State University